The 1984 Minnesota Golden Gophers football team represented the University of Minnesota in the 1984 Big Ten Conference football season. In their first year under head coach Lou Holtz, the Golden Gophers compiled a 4–7 record and were outscored by their opponents by a combined total of 316 to 194. 
 
Quarterback Rickey Foggie received the team's Most Valuable Player award. Linebacker Peter Najarian, punter Adam Kelly and offensive tackle Mark VonderHaar were named All-Big Ten second team.  Linebacker Peter Najarian, defensive lineman Craig Paulson and running back David Puk were named Academic All-Big Ten.Mark VondeHaar was awarded the Bruce Smith Award.  Peter Najarian was awarded the Carl Eller Award.  Strong safety Larry Joyner was awarded the Bobby Bell Award. Center John Kelly was awarded the Butch Nash Award. Flanker Dwayne McMullen was awarded the Paul Giel Award.

Total attendance for the season was 310,745, which averaged out to 51,791 per game. The season high for attendance was against rival Iowa.

Schedule

Roster
QB Rickey Foggie
K Chip Lohmiller, Fr.
OT Mark VonderHaar

Game summaries

Wisconsin

Minnesota's defense stopped Wisconsin on fourth down at the Gophers' two-yard line after the Badgers had driven 90 yards following Lohmiller's go-ahead field goal.

Rickey Foggie 24 Rush, 152 Yds

References

Minnesota
Minnesota Golden Gophers football seasons
Minnesota Golden Gophers football